Sergio García Ortíz (born 9 October 1989 in Barcelona) is a Spanish swimmer who competed in the 2008 Summer Olympics. Sergio was banned from the 2012 London Olympics due to multiple failures to report for drug testing.

Notes

References

External links
 
 
 
 

1989 births
Living people
Spanish male breaststroke swimmers
Olympic swimmers of Spain
Swimmers at the 2008 Summer Olympics